Hilma Gabriella Jahnsson (born Hägg, 3 February 1882 Turku, died 11 June 1975) was a Finnish lawyer. She was best known for her husband, professor Yrjö Jahnsson, as the founder of the foundation of her spouse. As Secretary of the Parliamentary Committee on Labor Affairs, she served in 1917-1930 and was also a party candidate for the Social Democratic Party in the 1933 parliamentary elections. She was the third female jurist in Finland.

References

1882 births
1975 deaths
Finnish women lawyers
20th-century Finnish lawyers